Letnyaya Stavka is a rural locality (a selo) and the administrative center of Turkmensky District, Stavropol Krai, Russia. Population:

References

Notes

Sources

Rural localities in Stavropol Krai